Hanene Al-Orfelli (also Hanene Ourfelli, ; born January 8, 1986) is a Tunisian weightlifter. Ourfelli represented Tunisia at the 2008 Summer Olympics in Beijing, where she competed for the women's middleweight category (63 kg). Ourfelli placed sixteenth in this event, as she successfully lifted 80 kg in the single-motion snatch, and hoisted 95 kg in the two-part, shoulder-to-overhead clean and jerk, for a total of 175 kg.

References

External links
 
 
 
 
 

Tunisian female weightlifters
1986 births
Living people
Olympic weightlifters of Tunisia
Weightlifters at the 2008 Summer Olympics
Mediterranean Games silver medalists for Tunisia
Mediterranean Games medalists in weightlifting
Competitors at the 2009 Mediterranean Games
21st-century Tunisian women